The Messingkauf Dialogues is an incomplete theoretical work by the twentieth-century German theatre practitioner Bertolt Brecht. John Willett translates "Der Messingkauf" as "Buying Brass". According to one Brecht scholar "Brecht worked on [the Messingkauf] primarily during the late 1930s and early 1940s. In Brecht’s words it contains, “a lot of theory in dialog form.”"

References

Bertolt Brecht theories and techniques
Works about playwrighting